Angicos is a microregion in the Brazilian state of Rio Grande do Norte.

Municipalities 
The microregion consists of the following municipalities:
 Afonso Bezerra
 Angicos
 Caiçara do Rio do Vento
 Fernando Pedroza
 Jardim de Angicos
 Lajes
 Pedra Preta
 Pedro Avelino

References

Microregions of Rio Grande do Norte